Robert Bush or Bob Bush may refer to:

 Robert Edwin Bush (1855–1939), Australian settler and cricketer
 Robert Eugene Bush (1926–2005), U.S. sailor, Medal of Honor recipient
 Robert P. Bush (1842–1923), American physician, soldier and politician
 Robert Bush (cyclist) (born 1990), American cyclist
 Robert Bush (Surrey cricketer) (1839–1874), English cricketer